Hemiphyllodactylus dushanensis, also known as the Dushan slender gecko, Dushan gypsy gecko, or Dushan dwarf gecko, is a species of gecko. It is found in China (Guizhou). It is named after its type locality, Dushan.

References

Hemiphyllodactylus
Reptiles of China
Endemic fauna of China
Reptiles described in 1981